Wu Wenjuan (born 1981) is a Chinese team handball player. Playing on the Chinese national team, she competed at the 2008 Summer Olympics in Beijing, where China placed sixth.

References

1981 births
Living people
Chinese female handball players
Olympic handball players of China
Handball players at the 2008 Summer Olympics
Sportspeople from Shanghai
Handball players at the 2006 Asian Games
Asian Games competitors for China
21st-century Chinese women